The O.B. Hardison Jr. Poetry Prize was awarded by the Folger Shakespeare Library to honor a U.S. poet whose art and teaching demonstrated great imagination and daring. The poet must have published at least one book within the last five years, must have made important contributions as a teacher, and must be committed to furthering the understanding of poetry.

The prize is named after former Folger Library Director O.B. Hardison Jr. (1928–1990), who founded the Folger Poetry Series in 1970. Hardison Prize honorees received $10,000.

Recipients
2009—Juliana Spahr
2008—Mary Kinzie
2007—David Wojahn
2006—David Rivard
2005—Tony Hoagland
2004—Reginald Gibbons
2003—Cornelius Eady 
2002—Ellen Bryant Voigt 
2001—David St. John 
2000—Rachel Hadas 
1999—Alan Shapiro 
1998—Heather McHugh
1997—Frank Bidart
1996—Jorie Graham
1995—E. Ethelbert Miller
1994—R.H.W. Dillard
1993—John Frederick Nims
1992—Cynthia Macdonald
1991—Brendan Galvin

See also
American poetry
List of poetry awards
List of literary awards
List of years in poetry
List of years in literature

Notes

External links
Folger Library Web page on past winners of the Hardison Prize

American poetry awards